Thomas Muster was the defending champion but lost in the quarterfinals to Andrea Gaudenzi.

Marcelo Ríos won in the final 6–2, 6–4 against Félix Mantilla.

Seeds
A champion seed is indicated in bold text while text in italics indicates the round in which that seed was eliminated.

  Thomas Muster (quarterfinals)
  Marcelo Ríos (champion)
  Byron Black (second round)
  Gilbert Schaller (first round)
  Alberto Berasategui (first round)
  Ctislav Doseděl (semifinals)
  Francisco Clavet (quarterfinals)
  Andrea Gaudenzi (semifinals)

Draw

References
 1996 International ÖTV Raiffeisen Grand Prix Draw

Hypo Group Tennis International
1996 ATP Tour